Sandiah, also known as Ibu Kasur (January 16, 1926 – October 22, 2002) was an Indonesian artist, television presenter and educator.

Life 
Together with Pak Kasur, she was the host of the Taman Indria program on TVRI. When private television appeared in the early 1990s, Ibu Kasur appeared in the Hip Hip Ceria quiz show on RCTI.

She founded Mini Kindergarten in Jakarta in 1965. Some of the famous Mini Kindergarten graduates are former presidents Megawati Soekarnoputri, Guruh Soekarnoputra, Hayono Isman and Ateng Wahyudi.

Ibu Kasur is also known as a songwriter for children. Her works include My Cat, Clap your hands, and Play Hide.  Ibu Kasur was a frequent speaker at seminars related to children. She also led the Setia Balita Foundation, which has five kindergartens in Jakarta. She was editor of a section in the children's magazine Bocil.

Ibu Kasur died at Cikini Hospital cause of stroke attack, on 22 October 2002. She was buried next to Pak Kasur's grave in the village of Kaliori, Kalibagor, Banyumas, Central Java.

Family 
Sandiah met her husband as they were both members of Indonesian Scouts. They were married in Yogyakarta on 29 July 1946.

Tribute 

On 16 January 2022, Google Doodle celebrated Sandiah Ibu Kasur’s 96th birthday.

References

External links 

 http://myspaceon-neea.blogspot.com/2009/09/bu-kasur.html

1926 births
2002 deaths
Indonesian educators
Indonesian women educators
Indonesian television presenters
Indonesian women television presenters